Michel Thompson (1921–2007) was a French painter.

Public collections 

 Blois Museum: Interior scene, oil on canvas, 1949;

 Musée d'art Roger-Quilliot, Clermont-Ferrand: Woman at her toilette, oil on canvas, 1951;

 Musée d'Art Moderne de Paris: Still life with saucepan, oil on canvas, 1960;

 Musée d'art et d'histoire de Saint-Denis: The train, oil on canvas, 1956;

 Villeneuve-sur-Lot Museum: Portrait of Claudine with oranges, oil on canvas, 1949.

Bibliography 

 Michel Thompson, preface by Georges-Emmanuel Clancier, Artko Gallery, Toulouse, 1988.
 Lydia Harambourg, “Michel Thompson”, in The School of Paris, 1945-1965, Éditions Ides et Calendes, Neuchâtel, 1993.
 Caroline Benzaria, Michel Thompson, preface by Edgar Morin, Éditions Altamira, Paris, 2006.

References

External links 
 Michel Thompson on Artnet

1921 births
2007 deaths
20th-century French painters
20th-century French male artists
French male painters
21st-century French painters
21st-century French male artists